Antonio Buero Vallejo (September 29, 1916 – April 29, 2000) was a Spanish playwright associated with the Generation of '36 movement and considered the most important Spanish dramatist of the Spanish Civil War.

Biography
During his career he won three National Theatre Prizes (in 1957, 1958 and 1959), a National Theatre Prize for all his career in 1980, the National Literature Prize in 1996, and the Miguel de Cervantes Prize, Spain's highest literary honour, in 1986. From 1971 until his death he was a member of the Real Academia Española.

From 1934 to 1936 Vallejo studied art and painting at San Fernando Escuela de Arte, in Madrid. During the civil war he joined the Communist Party of Spain and served as a medical aid in the Republican Army.

After the war he was imprisoned for six years. After being released he wrote Story of a Stairway in 1949. This work presented a graphic picture of Spain after the Civil War and won the Lope de Vega Prize, establishing Vallejo as one of the foremost authors in Spain. While other authors left Spain to escape Franco's censorship, Vallejo stayed in Spain and used symbolism to criticise the government. In 1971, he was elected to the Royal Spanish Academy. In 1994 he was awarded the Gold Medal of Merit in Fine Arts and the Gold Medal of the Society of Authors of Spain. 

He died due to a stroke on April 29, 2000, aged 83.

A common theme in his work is Spain's problems during and after Franco. In the tragedies there is always a sense of hope for the future. His works make frequent use of the symbolism of the senses—for example, using the "fiery darkness," in which the protagonist cannot see, as a symbol of Spain's dark situation.

Awards
 Miguel de Cervantes Prize 1986
 National Theatre Prize 1957, 1958, 1959, & 1996

Works
 Historia de una escalera ("Story of a Stairway")(1949) 
 En la ardiente oscuridad ("In The Burning Darkness") (1950)
 La tejedora de sueños (1952)
 La señal que se espera (1952)
 Casi un cuento de hadas (1953)
 Madrugada (1953)
 Irene o el tesoro (1954)
 Las cartas boca abajo (1957)
 Hoy es fiesta (1955)
 Un soñador para un pueblo (1958) 
 Las Meninas (1960)
 El concierto de San Ovidio ("The concert at Saint-Ovide Fair") (1962)
 Aventura en lo gris (1963)
 El tragaluz ("The basement window") (1967)
 La doble historia del doctor Valmy ("The double-case history of Doctor Valmy")(1968)
 El sueño de la razón ("The Sleep of Reason") (1970)
 La detonación ("The Shot")(1977)
 Llegada de los dioses (1971)
 La Fundación ("The Foundation") (1974)
 Jueces en la noche ("Judges in the Night") (1979)
 Caimán (1981)
 Diálogo secreto (1984)
 Lázaro en el laberinto (1986)
 Música cercana ("The music window")(1989)
 Las trampas del azar (1994)
 Misión al pueblo desierto (1999)

See also
 Café Gijón (Madrid)

Footnotes

External links 
Antonio Buero Vallejo at Miguel de Cervantes Virtual Library (cervantesvirtual.com) 
Antonio Buero Vallejo at Castilla-La Mancha Library site (sacm.jccm.es) 

1916 births
2000 deaths
Spanish male dramatists and playwrights
Members of the Royal Spanish Academy
Premio Cervantes winners
20th-century Spanish dramatists and playwrights
20th-century Spanish male writers
People from Guadalajara, Spain